Guzanli Olympic Complex Stadium is located in Quzanlı, Aghdam, Azerbaijan. It is used by FK Karabakh as home stadium since May 2009 and has a capacity of 2000.

References

See also
List of football stadiums in Azerbaijan

Sport in Azerbaijan
Football venues in Azerbaijan